Jonny Blair is a Scottish film director and screenwriter best known for his short film The Groundsman starring David O'Hara. His film, The Groundsman won the Best Fiction and Best Editing accolades at the 2014 British Academy Scotland New Talent Awards.

Blair is a graduate of the National Film and Television School.

Awards

Filmography

Writer/Director
 Come Out of the Woods (2017)
 The Groundsman (2013)

External links

References

British film directors
British Academy Scotland New Talent Award Winners
Living people
1992 births